Brian Elwin Haner Jr. (born July 7, 1981), better known by his stage name Synyster Gates or simply Syn, is an American guitarist, best known for being the lead guitarist and backing vocalist of heavy metal band Avenged Sevenfold. He ranks No. 9 on Guitar Worlds best metal guitarists of all time. Gates was voted as Best Metal Guitarist in the World by Total Guitar in 2016 and once again in 2017.

Early life
Synyster Gates is the son of musician, author, and comedian Brian Haner Sr., known as Papa Gates, who worked with Sam the Sham's band in the 1970s and has done session work for Avenged Sevenfold. Gates studied at the Musicians Institute in Los Angeles, California, as part of the Guitar Institute of Music program, studying jazz and classical guitar. Gates is of Spanish and German ancestry.

Career

Avenged Sevenfold

Gates was featured on the EP Warmness on the Soul, which contains select songs from the first album as well as his new version of "To End the Rapture". His name on the EP was written as "Synyster Gaytes".

On the Avenged Sevenfold DVD All Excess, Gates claimed that his name was created on a drunken drive through the park with The Rev.

Gates was voted Sexiest Male in the 2008 Kerrang! Readers Poll. In 2010, Guitar World listed him as one of the 30 greatest shredders of all time. They described him as being able to perform finger-twisting licks, acrobatic sweeps, devilish chromatics and towering dual-harmonies. Gates was chosen as one of Guitar Hero's 50 fastest guitarists. On Guitar World's 2010 Readers Poll, Gates was chosen Snappiest Dresser and the Best Metal Guitarist. Rock One Magazine's 2010 Readers Poll voted Gates the No. 3 best musician in the industry. On April 20, 2011, Gates won the Revolver Golden God award for Best Guitarist along with bandmate Zacky Vengeance. Avenged Sevenfold picked up numerous other awards and delivered the headlining performance of the night. 

In the special edition of Revolver magazine that was released the same day as the Nightmare album, Gates stated that he originally started out writing the song "So Far Away" in honor of his grandfather. However, the song is now primarily about his former bandmate, best friend and previous drummer of Avenged Sevenfold, The Rev, who died on December 28, 2009.

Pinkly Smooth
Gates and The Rev played in an experimental metal band named Pinkly Smooth. Formed in the summer of 2001 in Huntington Beach, California, the band featured ex-Ballistico members Buck Silverspur on bass and D-Rock on drums. The band released one album, Unfortunate Snort on Bucktan Records, which features a crossover sound of mostly punk, ska and progressive metal. Former Avenged Sevenfold bassist Justin Sane played keyboards and piano on the album. There was speculation that Pinkly Smooth was going to produce another record, but due to the death of the Rev, it is highly unlikely that they will produce any more material. However, Gates has said that he would consider remastering the tracks from Unfortunate Snort and re-releasing the album.

Influences
Besides metal music, Gates is a big fan of jazz, gypsy jazz, classical, and avant-garde. He cites Dimebag Darrell, Django Reinhardt, Steve Vai, John Petrucci, Slash, Marty Friedman, Zakk Wylde, Allan Holdsworth, Mr. Bungle, Frank Gambale, Oingo Boingo, and Danny Elfman as his artistic influences.

Gates has named bassist Trevor Dunn of Mr. Bungle "one of [his] favorite songwriters of all time", praising his compositions of "masterful and incredibly singable atonal brilliance throughout [1995 album Disco Volante]", and concluded: "[Dunn] is nothing short of pure genius."

Personal life
Gates married Michelle DiBenedetto in May 2010. The couple have two children, a son born in 2017 and a daughter born in 2019.

Michelle's twin sister, Valary, is married to M. Shadows.

Discography

With Avenged Sevenfold 

Sounding the Seventh Trumpet (2001) 
Waking the Fallen (2003)
City of Evil (2005)
Avenged Sevenfold (2007)
Nightmare (2010)
Hail to the King (2013)
The Stage (2016)
Life Is but a Dream... (2023)

With Pinkly Smooth 
Unfortunate Snort (2001)

Featured guest appearances
 Bleeding Through's "Savior, Saint, Salvation," track (with M. Shadows).
 Good Charlotte's "The River" track and music video (with M. Shadows).
 Burn Halo's "Dirty Little Girl" track and music video.
 Burn Halo's "Anejo" track.
 Brian Haner's "Blow-Up Doll" music video.
 The Jeff Dunham Show intro song (with his father).
 AxeWound's "Vultures" from their debut album of the same name.
Machine Gun Kelly's "Save Me" from the album Lace Up (with M. Shadows).
 Linkin Park's "Faint" live at Chester Bennington's memorial concert (with M. Shadows).

Guitars

Gates uses mainly Schecter Guitars. Schecter Guitar Research has been sponsoring him and he has signature Avenger models. He has also used Gibson Guitars when Avenged Sevenfold recorded Waking the Fallen and City of Evil. He has his own Seymour Duncan pickups, a custom SH-8 Invader, with Black, Gold, White or Chrome caps.
 Schecter Synyster Custom-S (Black with Silver pinstripes, Black with Gold pinstripes, Black with Red pinstripes, White with Gold pinstripes, White with Black pinstripes, Gold Burst, Dark Earth Burst)
 Schecter custom models with Rebel flag, American flag, German flag, Black with Red Stripes, Red with Black Stripes, White with Gold Stripes, White with Black Stripes, one featuring Jack Nicholson's Joker art and color scheme.
 Schecter Synyster Gates Custom with "REV" inlays on fret board, instead of "SYN" featured in the "So Far Away" music video
 Schecter Synyster Custom
 Schecter Synyster Acoustic
 Schecter Synyster 8-String Prototype
 Schecter Synyster Deluxe Prototype
 Schecter Synyster Special
 Schecter Avenger
 Schecter C-1 Classic - Transparent Blue
 Schecter Custom C-1 FR
 Schecter Omen-6 FR 
 Gibson ES-335
 Schecter Hellraiser C-1 FR(white, black)
 Schecter Scorpion with Seymour Duncan JBs
 Schecter PT Fastback
 Schecter S-1 loaded with Seymour Duncan JBs
 Gibson Les Paul Custom (arctic white)
 Parker Fly
 Epiphone Rockbass
 Fernandez Guitars FR95s with a sustainer single coil pickup as seen on "Making of Brompton Cocktail"

References

External links

1981 births
Living people
Avenged Sevenfold members
Lead guitarists
American heavy metal guitarists
Musicians Institute alumni
Musicians from Long Beach, California